In law, a resolution is a written motion adopted by a deliberative body.  The substance of the resolution can be anything that can normally be proposed as a motion.  For long or important motions, though, it is often better to have them written out so that discussion is easier or so that it can be distributed outside the body after its adoption. An alternate term for a resolution is a resolve.

Resolutions are commonly used in corporations and houses of legislature.

In corporations

In corporations, a written resolution is especially useful in the case of the board of directors of a corporation, which usually needs to give its consent to real estate purchases or sales by the corporation.  Such a resolution, when certified by the corporation's secretary, gives assurance to the other side of the transaction that the sale was properly authorized.  Other examples include resolutions approving the opening of bank accounts or authorizing the issuance of shares in the corporation.

Houses of legislature
When greater formality is desired, a motion may be made in the form of a resolution, which is always submitted in writing.

Houses of a legislature often adopt non-binding resolutions.

However, a legislature also uses resolutions to exercise one of its binding powers that isn't a lawmaking power. For example, the United States Congress declares war or proposes constitutional amendments by adopting a joint resolution. A house of a legislature can also use a resolution to exercise its specific powers, as the British House of Commons does to elect its Speaker or as the United States House of Representatives does to impeach an officer of the government.

Types

Non-binding

In a house of a legislature, the term non-binding resolution refers to measures that do not become laws. This is used to differentiate those measures from a bill, which is also a resolution in the technical sense.  The resolution is often used to express the body's approval or disapproval of something which they cannot otherwise vote on, due to the matter being handled by another jurisdiction, or being protected by a constitution.  An example would be a resolution of support for a nation's troops in battle, which carries no legal weight, but is adopted for moral support.

Substantive and procedural 
Substantive resolutions apply to essential legal principles and rules of right, analogous to substantive law, in contrast to procedural resolutions, which deal with the methods and means by which substantive items are made and administered.

Historical examples of resolutions
Gulf of Tonkin Resolution
Kentucky and Virginia Resolutions
United Nations General Assembly resolutions
United Nations Security Council resolutions
War Powers Resolution

See also
Courtesy resolution
Main motion
Preamble

References 

 
Motions (parliamentary procedure)
Parliamentary procedure